Juan Pablo Estelles (born May 5, 1988) is an Argentine rugby sevens player. He represented  at the 2016 Summer Olympics.

Juan Pablo has been playing for Club Atlético del Rosario, one of Argentina's oldest clubs, since 2009. Estelles also turned out for the Pampas XV in the Vodacom Cup between 2009 and 2013. The swift centre represented  at various age group levels and became a regular for the country in the World Rugby Sevens Series.

Estelles signed with English club Northampton Saints in the summer of 2016 and played a few fixtures with their second team, Northampton Wanderers before making his debut in the Anglo-Welsh Cup against Newcastle Falcons.

Most recently Estelles helped the Wanderers reach the final of the 2016/17 Aviva 'A' League but on being called up to Saints' first team due to other injuries in the squad, the winger, too, found himself injured and missed out on the final where the Wanderers defeated Gloucester United to claim the title.

References

External links 
 
 UAR Profile
 Northampton Saints Profile

1988 births
Living people
Male rugby sevens players
Argentine rugby union players
Olympic rugby sevens players of Argentina
Argentina international rugby sevens players
Rugby sevens players at the 2016 Summer Olympics
Northampton Saints players
Argentine expatriate sportspeople in England
Sportspeople from Rosario, Santa Fe
Argentina international rugby union players